Abdulrahman Hamid Mohammed Al-Hussaini is the ambassador of Iraq to Russia since 05 February 2020.

References
http://www.international.gc.ca/media/aff/photos/2011/98.aspx?lang=eng
http://www.embassynews.ca/diplomatic-circles/2010/07/21/bridging-the-gaps-between-iraq-and-canada/39172
https://web.archive.org/web/20190325222228/http://mofamission.gov.iq/en/canadaot%26subcat%3D81

Ambassadors of Iraq to Canada
1958 births
Living people
Iraqi diplomats